Nepal Idol is a Nepali reality television singing competition that is part of the Idols franchise created and owned by FremantleMedia. Nepal Idol 2017 is the first season of Idol Franchise in Nepal which aired on AP1 TV.

In the first season, audition were held at seven cities; Nepalgunj, Butwal, Narayangarh, Birgunj, Biratnagar, Pokhara and Kathmandu. Contestants aged 16 to 30 years of age are allowed to participate. The first ever season of the show was won by Buddha Lama from Pokhara, Nepal in which a total of 93,100,000 votes were cast for the grand finale. Similarly, the second season of Nepal Idol was won by Ravi Oad from Dhangadi. And, the third season of Nepal Idol was won by Sajja Chaulagain from Morang. According to organizers more than 1,25,000 people were watching the Grand Finale Event live on YouTube, which was a record for any Nepalese Television Show to be watched online. Nepal Idol is produced by AP1 TV for Annapurna Media Network.

In the finale event of season 3, the announcement of winner was affected due to COVID-19 positive case from one of the production team member which withheld the finale program and winner was declared by digital method.

For Season 4, all past three judges got replaced by new judges, namely, Sambhujeet Baskota, Sugam Pokharel  and Subani Moktan. Bhupendra Thapa Magar was winner of season 4. It is said that all three judges are to be replaced by new judges once again. The commencement of Season 5 is yet is confirmed as all previous directors and makers left AP1 TV and there's no one to organise the program. Also, Season 4 was in loss. Still payments are to be made for different parties.

Format 
Nepal Idol also follows the format provided by FremantleMedia from Idol Bible and followed by other versions of Idol Series.

Hosts
As per the format, there is at least one or two hosts both of them being of same gender or opposite gender. Nepal Idol was hosted by television actor and model Sushil Nepal and actress, model, VJ and television journalist Reema Bishwokarma. After announcement of season 2 Sushil Nepal  was replaced by versatile and talented media personality Asif Shah who is also Television Producer, music video and tvc director, singer and actor from famous Nepali movie, 'Dui Rupiyan'. For season 3, new host Mampi Ghosh replaced Reema Bishwokarma who moved to Comedy Champions. In 2019, Asif Shah and Mampi Ghosh, previously known as Pawankali, hosted the third season. Similarly, Mampi Ghosh got replaced by Reshma Ghimire in Season 4.

Judges
A preselected panel of music industry representatives are given to judge the contestants in prejudge round which is not televised. Actual panel of judges of three or five judge the contestants from Televised Audition to Grand Finale.

Season 1-3 
In season one, two and three the judges were Nhyoo Bajracharya, Indira Joshi and Kali Prasad Baskota. Bajracharya is a music composer and singer. He has composed dozens of famous songs in Nepali, Nepal bhasa and Hindi. His popular compositions include 'ful ko aakhaa ma fulai sanasar' with Ani Choying Drolma with his fusion style music. Indira Joshi is a singer, model, and actress. She released the song 'Rato Ghanghara' from her album 'Dance with Me'. She has also sung the item number Udhreko choli from the movie Loot (2012 film). She had already been among top 5 contestants in the first season of Nepali singing reality show Nepali Tara. Kali Prasad Baskota is a singer, musician, writer, and lyricist. His initial hits were the songs like 'Chahana Sakiyo' and 'Laija Re'. Kali had done his singing debut from song 'Jaalma' from movie 'Resham filili' which was one of the biggest hit of that time. His other popular compositions includes 'Thamel Baazar' from the movie 'Loot 2', 'Nira' from 'Purano Dunga' movie and one of the biggest hit 'Saili.'All three judges were replaced in Season 4 as they moved for other reality show, Saregamapa Lil Champs.

Season 4 
All three judges from last three seasons were replaced by Sambhujeet Baskota, Subani Moktan and Sugam Pokharel. Sambhujeet Baskota is a Nepali music composer who is considered to be the most popular and prolific music director of the Nepali Film Industry. He has composed over 3,000 songs, which have appeared in more than 250 films. He has composed songs for many Nepali hit films like Prem Pinda, Karodpati, Thuldai etc. Similarly, Sugam Pokharel is a Nepali popular pop singer, songwriter, RJ and music composer who is working in the Nepali music industry since 1995. In recent years, he has been also known as a popular playback singer. He became popular as a playback singer for the song Ke yo Maya ho from the movie Mero Auta Sathi Chha. Most of the Nepali people remember him for the festival song Dashain Tihar. He has given many other hit songs such as Mero Auta Sathi Chha, Mero Sansar, K yo Maya ho, Feri tyo din, etc. Likewise, Subani Moktan is a singer/songwriter and also a music arranger. Besides her own independent music, she also works as a playback singer for movies and a teacher at Kathmandu Jazz Conservatory.

Performance stages
 Auditions are held in numerous places in any particular region or country that give most people (audition entry is bound by certain legal requirements such as age and citizenship for example) the chance to sing in front of musical/television producers and if successful, they advance to a recorded televised audition where the show "judges" advance up to 300 people in some countries to the next round.
 The Theatre round is where a specially selected group of auditioners from all regional auditions converge (always in the host city) to perform in three sub stages: a chorus line in groups of 10 where free song choices are allowed, a trio (or less commonly a duo or quartet) where contestants must memorize a preselected song to perform and choreograph together, and finally a solo a cappella round where contestants sing a song of their own choice without musical backing in front of friends, family, judges & fellow contestants. Each stage of the theatre round, a number of contestants are eliminated and sent home by the judges, very few contestants brought back during the Wildcards show.
Paino Round: After theatre, top 18 or top 20 contestants are selected. They are divided into 8 or 10 within themselves and 3 or 4 are eliminated from the round. Eliminated contestants are brought back during wildcard shows.
Gala Round: The gala occurs usually pre-recorded where contestants sing in a television studio fully televised; again judges give critiques but beginning at this stage, home viewers vote via telephone and SMS (and in some countries other voting mechanisms including via Internet) who they want to stay in the competition. The contestants are judged by 50% audience vote and 50% judges marking. Gala usually consists of 12 contestants where they perform individually or in a group (usually in elimination day) semi-final contestants sing every week until all finalists have been chosen. Wildcards episode is also featured. Judges can use veto power of no elimination for only one time.
Grand Finale:  The Grand Finale occurs when there are three contestants left in the competition. This is the pinnacle of the entire series and often highest-rated show; also for some countries, it is venued in a prestigious location. There are usually group performances and/or special musical guests. Also, it has the best moments of the series which leads up to the announcement of the winner, which is determined by the highest number of votes. When that happens, he or she will perform an encore of the coronation single which sometimes includes pyrotechnics/fireworks. In every round, the set is often changed.

Season 1
The Project Head of the first-ever franchise singing reality show was Suresh Poudel. He is veteran in Nepali media with the background of working in popular media house in leading position for more than 25 years. The show was directed by Laxman Paudyal. Asst. directors are Manoj K.C. Samaya, Surace Dulal AKA Babu Surace D.C, Mohan Raj Adhikari. Chief Asst. director is Aleen Shrestha. Buddha Lama was the winner of the first season who also happened to be the youngest contestant to be selected.

Audition 

 The dates in bold are written in Vikram Samvat.

Top 18 Performers

Elimination Chart 

 The judges' save starts.
 The judges' save ends.

Guest appearances 
Komal Oli (Episode 22)
Lochan Rijal (Episode 22)
Tulsi Ghimire (Episode 23)
Prem Dhoj Pradhan (Episode 25)
Rajan Ishan (Episode 25)
Sanup Paudel (Episode 26)
Shiva Lamichhane (Episode 26)
Mingma Sherpa (Episode 26)
Ciney Gurung (Episode 26)
Yubaraj Chaulagain (Episode 26)
Kamal Khatri (Episode 26)
Bishwa Nepali (Episode 26)
Kali Prasad Rijal (Episode 28)
Pramod Kharel (Episode 30)
Ram Krishna Dhakal (Episode 31)
Rajesh Payal Rai (Episode 32)
Nischal Basnet (Episode 33)
Aasif Shah (Episode 33)
Paul Shah (Episode 35)
Aanchal Sharma (Episode 35)
Hari Bansha Acharya (Finale)
Madan Krishna Shrestha (Finale)

Season 2 
It was officially announced in early 2018 that Nepal Idol will be back for another season. Season 2 auditions started from March 20 in Bhairahawa. The other announced locations were Dhangadhi, Hetauda, Dharan, Pokhara along with Kathmandu. After the auditions were concluded, the show aired from August 7. The directors for season 2 are Suresh Paudel, Aleen Shrestha and Lokesh Bajracharya. Aleen Shrestha is also the Director of Nepal's first-ever franchise dance reality show Boogie Woogie Nepal. Whereas, Lokesh Bajracharya is a well known name in visual-editing field in Nepal. The show was hosted by Asif Shah (replacing Former host Sushil Nepal) and Reema Bishwokarma. The assistant directors are Mohan Raj Adhikari and Babu Surace D.C.(Surace Dulal). Director Of Photography is Shiva Ram Shrestha.

Audition 
The audition for the Second season of Nepal Idol were held on:

 The dates in bold are written in Vikram Samvat.

Episodes 

 Episodes are entitled according to rounds.

Elimination Chart

Guest Appearance
 Hemant Sharma (Episode 11)
 Astha Raut (Episode 11)
 Suresh Adhikari (Episode 14)
 Nima Rumba (Episode 16)
 Deepak Raj Giri (Episode 17)
 Kedar Ghimire (Episode 17)
 Raju Lama (Episode 18)
 Hemant Rana Magar (Episode 19)
 Swasmita Khadka (Episode 20)
 Khagendra Lamichhane (Episode 20)
 Ashok Sharma (Episode 20)
 Sandip Chettri (Episode 21)
 Aayushman Deshraj Shrestha Joshi (Episode 21)
 Dipendra K. Khanal (Episode 22)
 Nishan Bhattarai (Episode 22)
 Pratap Das (Episode 22)
 Buddha Lama (Episode 22)
 Sambhujeet Baskota (Episode 23)
 Nischal Basnet (Episode 24)
 Dinesh Raut (Episode 24)
 Deepak Bajracharya (Episode 25)
 Anuradha Koirala (Episode 26)
 Jayananda Lama (Episode 27)
 Suraj Thapa (Episode 27)
 Deepak Jangam (Episode 28)
 Raj Sigdel (Episode 29)
 Swopnil Sharma (Episode 29)
 Tsuil Karmacharya (Episode 29)
 Tika Prasai (Episode 29)
 Santosh Lama (Episode 29)
 Rejina Rimal (Episode 29)
 Pusphan Pradhan (Episode 29)
 Shiva Pariyar (Episode 30)
 Sitaram Kattel Dhurmus (Episode 31)
 Kunjana Ghimire Suntali (Episode 31)
 Gopal Rasaili (Episode 32)
 Namrata Shrestha (Episode 32)
 Arjun Pokhrel (Episode 33)
 Neer Shah (Episode 34)
 Dinesh Adhikari (Episode 34)
 Salon Basnet (Episode 34)
 Sara Shripali (Episode 34)
 Subrat Raj Aacharya (Episode 34)

Season 3
Nepal Idol Season 3 was officially announced on July 13 by AP1 TV by uploading its promotional video on YouTube.
The directors for season 3 were Suresh Paudel, Aleen Shrestha and  Lokesh Bajracharya. The show was hosted by Aasif Shah and Mampi Ghosh, as the previous host Reema left the show and moved to another reality show called Comedy Champion. The assistant director was Mohan Raj Adhikari and Babu Surace D.C.(Surace Dulal) and the Director Of Photography was Shiva Ram Shrestha. The Reality producer was Bishal Aryal and production manager was Manish Banjara (Kaudinya).

Auditions 
The audition for the Third season of Nepal Idol was held on:

 The dates in bold are written in Vikram Samvat.

Digital auditions 
For the first time ever, the organizer announced Digital Auditions in which, participants can record a video and upload it into Respect & Rise App for audition purpose (due to covid situation). Selected candidates from Digital Auditions were called to Kathmandu for the Studio Rounds.

Airing Date 
Official Page of Nepal Idol announced that Season 3 will be airing from 19 December 2019. This time there is a slight change in the format of the show. Host for season 2 Reema Bishwokarma was replaced by Mampi Ghosh (earlier known as Pawankali) as she moved to Nepal's first comedy reality show, 'Comedy Champions'.

Format 
For this season tagline of the show is 'संगीतको शिखर' (English: The pinnacle of music) so the format has been designed so that contestants participating are climbing mountain.

Episodes 
After airing wildcard special episode, due to fear of COVID-19 virus outbreak production and airing of Nepal Idol was postponed for 139 days. Nepal Idol resumed from August 6, 2020.

Special Episodes

Elimination Chart

Guest Appearance 
 Najjir Husain (Episode 4)
 James Pradhan (Episode 11 & 12)
 Milan Newar (Episode 13)
 Herchulus Basnet (Episode 14)
 Kunti Moktan (Episode 15)
 Shila Bahadur Moktan (Episode 15)
 Basanta Sapkota (Episode 16)
 Uday Sotang (Episode 17)
 Malina Sotang (Episode 17)
 Abahya Subba (Episode 18)
 Karna Das (Episode 19)
 Devika Bandana (Episode 20)
 Buddha Lama (Episode 21)
 Nishan Bhattarai (Episode 21)
 Pratap Das (Episode 21)
 Ravi Oad (Episode 21)
 Bikram Baral (Episode 21)
 Sumit Pathak (Episode 21)
 Asmita Adhikari (Episode 21)
 Amit Baral (Episode 21)
 Pawan Giri (Episode 21)
 Mukti Shakya (Episode 22)
 Anushka Shrestha (Episode 23)
 Rose Lama (Episode 23)
 Meera Rana (Episode 24)
 Swopnil Sharma (Episode 25)
 Manish Dhakal (Episode 25)
 Dharmendra Shewan (Episode 25)
 Samriddhi Rai (Episode 25)
 Rohit Jung Chettri (Episode 25)
 Mahesh Kafle (Episode 25)
 Meena Niroula (Episode 26)
 Prakash Sayami (Episode 27)
 Biplap Pratik (Episode 28)

Golden Microphone Winner 
 Megha Shrestha (Episode 1)

Season 4
AP1 TV confirmed season 4 by publishing promo released on July 21, 2021. Since judges from last 3 season were hired by another reality show SaReGaMaPa Lil'l Champs Nepal, Nepal Idol have new faces for this season. Digital Audition was started from August 17. The directors for season 4 were Suresh Paudel,. The show was hosted by Aasif Shah and Reshma Ghimire. The assistant director was Mohan Raj Adhikari.

List of New Judges and Hosts 
AP1 TV organized Press Meet on August 20, 2021, in its office to announce new judges and host for Nepal Idol Season 4. Following are new judges for Nepal Idol.

Digital Audition 
Due to COVID-19 and no permissions granted for physical audition, the production company announced Digital Auditions starting from August 17 for a month through APON App, an OTT platform developed by Annapurna Media Network.

Physical Audition 
Few of the selected participants from digital auditions will be called for physical audition in various cities which includes Biratnagar, Nepalgunj, Pokhara and Kathmandu.

Broadcast Date 
AP1 TV announced on air date by publishing promo video. Fourth season of show starts from December 9.

Theatre Round 
Selected participants from Physical Audition (Open Audition) would be kept in closed camp and Theatre Rounds will be conducted.

List of Episodes

Elimination Chart

Golden Microphone Winners 
 Rajkumar Pariyar (Episode 4)
Madan Gurung (Episode 5)

Guest Appearance 
 Sajja Chaulagain (Episode 12)
 Ananda Raj Karki (Episode 13)
 Alok Shree (Episode 14)
 Dhiraj Rai (Episode 15)
 Sanup Paudel (Episode 16)
 Sushant KC (Episode 16)
 Saroj Khanal (Episode 17)
 Paul Shah (Episode 18)
 Basanta Thapa (Episode 19)
 Vickey Agrawal (Episode 19)
 Shanti Shree Pariyar (Episode 20)
 Kunti Moktan (Episode 21)
 Sila Bahadur Moktan (Episode 21)
 Pusphan Pradhan (Episode 22)
 Amit Baral (Episode 22)
 Kamal Khatri (Episode 23)
 Bharatmani Paudel (Episode 23)
 Karna Das (Episode 24)
 Hari Bansha Acharya (Episode 25)
 Madan Krishna Shrestha (Episode 25)
 Bhupendra Khadka (Episode 26)
 Pratap Das (Episode 27)
 Nishan Bhattarai (Episode 27)
 Asmita Adhikari (Episode 27)
 Bikram Baral (Episode 27)
 Pawan Thapa (Episode 27)
 Prabin Bedwal (Episode 27)
 Bhuwan KC (Episode 28)
 Ajar Jangam (Episode 28)
 Divya Dev (Episode 28)
 Shristi Shrestha (Episode 28)
 Capt. Rameshwor Thapa (Episode 28)

Season 5
It is final that Nepal Idol is coming back with fifth season with new faces and new look from first half of 2023.

Controversy and lawsuit 
On 1 September 2017, the judges of the content announced that they would use their "veto" and not allow the elimination of any contestant at the end of that episode. The hosts announced that the votes received for that episode would be added to the next weeks elimination scores. However, the move drew considerable criticism on social media, with many accusing the producers of trying to make more money or trying to save their "favourite" contestant. After that they had to face a lawsuit against them.

A lawsuit was also subsequently filed by a local lawyer against Nepal Idol and the channel broadcasting the show, in which the plaintiff claimed that the judges did not allow the elimination to save their "favorite" contestant and not disclosing the result of the vote. This lawsuit was dismissed by the court, finding that the plaintiff did not have "sufficient grounds for their claim".

See also 
 Nepali Tara
 The Voice of Nepal

References

External links 
 

Idols (franchise)
Television series by Fremantle (company)
Nepalese reality television series
2017 Nepalese television series debuts
Television game shows
Nepalese television series
Non-British television series based on British television series
2010s game shows
2010s Nepalese television series